Archive 81 is a horror podcast created by Daniel Powell and Marc Sollinger and starring Amelia Kidd. It uses the found footage technique and follows the story of Dan (voiced by Daniel Powell), an archivist tasked to restore the audio recordings of Melody Pendras during her stay at the Visser Apartment. A television adaptation of the same name premiered on Netflix in January 2022.

Synopsis 
The show follows the story of an audio archivist named Dan, who has recently been hired for a job that involves reviewing and cataloguing a set of old audio tapes. The contract is for a group called the Housing Historical Committee of New York State and involves working at a remote and isolated bunker in the middle of the woods. Throughout his time on the job, Dan is contacted by his boss who insists that Dan must continuously record himself for archival and legal purposes. The audio tapes that Dan is listening to are over two decades old and contain interviews conducted by someone named Melody Pendras.

In the 1990s, Melody Pendras was doing interviews with residents of an old and mysterious Manhattan apartment building called the Eldritch Visser building. The interviews are with strange and eccentric residents of the building and often include references to a terrible and unnerving song that has affected the people living in the building. Throughout the first season, Dan attempts to make sense of the tapes and becomes increasingly rattled by the unsettling interviews carried out by Pendras. Pendras has a female partner named Alexa who is briefly introduced, but otherwise the tapes consist only of her interviews with other residents.

At the end of the first tape, Dan's best friend Mark reveals that he received these recordings from Dan in the mail and that Dan has been missing since January 2016. Mark is trying to figure out what happened to Dan by slowly releasing the audio to the public as a series of podcast episodes.

The second season follows Dan as he explores a different world.

The show contains a three-part miniseries called Left of the Dial, which began with an episode entitled "The Passenger". The miniseries follows the story of two characters named Nicholas and Static Man as they go on a road trip to a place called "the Blacktop".

Background and production 
Daniel Powell began recording radio shows at a young age using the family computer and Windows 95. Powell graduated from Darlington School and began his career in sound engineering. Powell was working from home in isolation, reviewing and archiving sound effects from an audio library for a company called Sound snap, when he and his friend Marc Sollinger came up with the idea for Archive 81. Sollinger worked as an associate producer on a radio program called Innovation Hub, which had support and funding from WGBH and Public Radio Exchange. Archive 81 did not have the same support and funding as Innovation Hub because it was produced independently, which meant that the first season was written, performed, recorded, and edited by themselves in a friend's bedroom.

The second season was released in January 2017. A month later, a mini-series titled The Golden Age was released, which uses the old school radio drama style production.

Characters

Main
 Dan (Daniel Powell) is an archivist employed by the "Housing Historical Committee of New York State" in 2015 and the protagonist of seasons 1 and 2. His task to digitize the tapes in Archive 81 leads him to become deeply invested in Melody and her findings at the Visser. In season 2, his body is forcefully modified to record and play tapes, replacing a third of his human body with machines. He briefly appears in the final episode of season 3.
 Mark (Marc Sollinger) is Dan's friend who has released the first season's tapes in order to solve the disappearance of Dan. He returns as the Leviathan Dromen in seasons 2 and 3. In The Golden Age, he appears as the foley artist for the radio production of Wingbeats, where it is also revealed how he became Dromen.
 Melody Pendras (Amelia Kidd) is a social worker surveying the Visser in 1994, under the supervision of the "Urban Preservation and Development Department of New York State". She mostly appears in the tapes archived by Dan, in which she interviews the residents living in the Visser and investigates meetings held by the Visser Historical Society. In season 2, it is revealed that she has taken residence in The city with her wife, Alexa.
 Oscar Waters (Peter Musante) is the director and lead actor of Wingbeats, starring as the King in the radio play. In The Golden Age, he recounts how he bought the script for Wingbeats from a mysterious shop in Paris, not knowing that the play is a ritual used to summon a Leviathan. He is the grandfather of Nicholas and Christine.
 Alice (Kristen DiMercurio) is a cast member of Wingbeats and plays the role of the Dancer.
 Patricia (Leigh Poulos) is a cast member of Wingbeats and plays the role of the Queen. She also appears in the 28th episode as Ms. Roland, a seller of "arcane artifacts" who transports Christine into another world to obtain some dream ambergris.
 Nicholas Waters (Peter Musante) is the protagonist of season 3 and Christine's half-brother. Throughout the season, he attempts to perform a ritual passed onto him by his deceased father. He is the grandson of Oscar Waters.
 Christine Anderson (Kristen DiMercurio) is the protagonist of season 3 and Nicholas' half-sister. Along with Nicholas, she performs the ritual given by their deceased father. In the 28th episode, she goes into a dream state where she becomes a crew member of The Irons. Since time moves differently in the dream state, she stays there for three years, but returns to the human world only moments after being put to sleep.

Recurring
 Mr. Davenport (David Powell) is a middle manager in LMG and Dan's employer.
 Samuel (Austin Mitchell)
 Jacob Lester (John Maher)
 Alexa (Carly Piersol)
 Suit (Lori-Felipe Barkin)
 Clara (Francesca Calo)
 Lou (Alister Austin)
 Payphone (Jamie Agnello)
 Static Man (Jack Calk)
 Aleister (Neil Tyrone)

List of episodes

Season 1 
The first season chronicles Dan's time in the bunker, which was recorded for legal purposes and due to the insistence of Mr. Davenport, the man who hired him to catalog and restore audio tapes from archive 81 of the Housing Historical Committee of New York State's tape library. Each episode ends with a note from Mark, Dan's friend, who has released the tapes to the public in an effort to find Dan, who has mysteriously disappeared.

Season 2 
The story focuses on Dan as he is transported to another world called The City. Each episode begins and ends with a note from a creature named Dromen.

The Golden Age

Season 3

Left of the Dial

Influences 
Powell and Sollinger view Orson Welles' radio drama The War of the Worlds as an inspiration and influence for their work on Archive 81. The show has influences from the soft horror and paranormal horror popularized by 90s television series such as Twin Peaks and The X Files. The show also has similarities to a Roberto Bolaño novel and contains references to David Cronenberg's film Videodrome. The show also has similarities to the urban horror themes present in series such as Candyman.

The show has been described as a radio drama, found-footage podcast, and a fictional scripted investigative journalism podcast. The show uses themes of conspiracy theories. The show is a mix of horror, fantasy, and sci-fi.

Reception 
The show was recommended by Cassandra Baim at The Guardian, saying that "the show will suck you in from the very first episode and leave you with new questions and theories after each listen."

The first season was ten episodes long and reached #25 on the iTunes Chart.

TV adaptation 

The podcast was adapted into television for Netflix by Rebecca Sonnenshine and Paul Harris Boardman. The show debuted on January 14, 2022, and stars Mamoudou Athie, Dina Shihabi, and Matt McGorry. The television series was loosely based on the same story. In the podcast Dan is restoring audiotapes, but in the television series he is restoring videotapes.

References

External links 

Audio podcasts
Horror podcasts
2016 podcast debuts
Science fiction podcasts
Lovecraftian horror
Patreon creators
Podcasts adapted into television shows
Scripted podcasts